Help! is the fifth studio album by the English rock band the Beatles and the soundtrack to their film of the same name. It was released on 6 August 1965. Seven of the fourteen songs, including the singles "Help!" and "Ticket to Ride", appeared in the film and take up the first side of the vinyl album. The second side includes "Yesterday", the most-covered song ever written. The album was met with favourable critical reviews and topped the Australian, German, UK and US charts.

During the recording sessions for the album, the Beatles continued to explore the studio's multitracking capabilities to layer their sound. "Yesterday" features a string quartet, the band's first use of Baroque sensibilities, and "You've Got to Hide Your Love Away" includes a flute section. The North American release is a true soundtrack album, combining the first seven songs with instrumental music from the film. The omitted tracks are instead spread across the Capitol Records LPs Beatles VI, Rubber Soul and Yesterday and Today.

In the US, Help! marked the start of artistic recognition for the Beatles from mainstream critics, including comparisons to the European art music tradition. It was nominated in the category of Album of the Year at the 1966 Grammys Awards, marking the first time that a rock band had been recognised in this category. In 2000, it was voted 119th in the third edition of Colin Larkin's book All Time Top 1000 Albums. In 2020, it was ranked 266th on Rolling Stone magazine's list of the "500 Greatest Albums of All Time". In September 2013, after the British Phonographic Industry changed its sales award rules, Help! was certified platinum for recorded sales since 1994.

Music
The album includes Paul McCartney's "Yesterday", arranged for guitar and string quartet and recorded without the other group members. John Lennon's "You've Got to Hide Your Love Away" indicates the influence of Bob Dylan and includes flutes.

"Ticket to Ride", released as a single in April 1965, was felt by Lennon to be "heavy" in its sound compared to the group's previous output and daring in its reference to a boy and girl living together. McCartney called the arrangement "quite radical". During the recording sessions for the album, the band used the studio's multitracking capabilities to layer their sound. In this, author Mark Prendergast highlights George Harrison's use of a volume pedal and incorporation of "more intricate chordal devices to enrich his guitar sound".

As a songwriter, Harrison contributed "I Need You" and "You Like Me Too Much". These were his first compositions to be included on a Beatles album since "Don't Bother Me" on 1963's With the Beatles.

The record contained two cover versions and a few tracks more closely related to the group's previous pop output, but still marked a decisive step forward. The record sleeve-note shows that Lennon and McCartney made more extensive and prominent use of keyboards, previously played unobtrusively by Martin. Four-track overdubbing technology encouraged this. Lennon, for his part, made much greater use of acoustic guitar.

The original LP's format of featuring songs from the soundtrack on side one and non-soundtrack songs on side two follows the format of A Hard Day's Night.

In later years, Lennon stated that the album's title track was a sincere cry for help; he regretted changing it from a downbeat, piano-driven ballad to an uptempo pop song, which was done only as a result of commercial pressures.

Help! was the band's final British album (aside from the late 1966 compilation A Collection of Beatles Oldies) to feature any cover songs until 1970's Let It Be (which included a performance of the traditional folk song "Maggie Mae"). In 1966, Capitol would release "Act Naturally", already on the British Help! album, on Yesterday and Today. "Bad Boy" and "Dizzy Miss Lizzy" (both written by Larry Williams and recorded on 10 May 1965, Williams' birthday) were both aimed at the American market and originally not intended to appear on Help!, but "Dizzy Miss Lizzy" ultimately did. Both songs appeared on Beatles VI, released in the US in June 1965. "Bad Boy" was not released in the UK until A Collection of Beatles Oldies, and was that album's only cover song.

Outtakes
A few songs that were recorded and intended for the album and film were not used. Lennon and McCartney wrote "If You've Got Trouble" for Ringo Starr to sing, but the Beatles were not satisfied with the song and it was abandoned, and Starr sang "Act Naturally" instead. "That Means a Lot" was written for the film, but again, the Beatles were displeased with their recordings of the song and it was given to P. J. Proby who released it as a single. Lennon said "Yes It Is" was "me trying a rewrite of 'This Boy', but it didn't work"; it was released as the B-side of "Ticket to Ride" and was also issued on Beatles VI. "You Like Me Too Much" and "Tell Me What You See" were turned down for use in the film by its director, Richard Lester, although they did appear on the album (and also on Beatles VI).

In June 1965, at the end of the Help! sessions, the song "Wait" was recorded for the album, but was left unfinished. The Beatles resurrected the track and completed it for inclusion on Rubber Soul in November, when a final song was needed to complete that album.

Album cover

The album cover shows the Beatles with their arms positioned to spell out a word in flag semaphore. According to cover photographer Robert Freeman, "I had the idea of semaphore spelling out the letters 'HELP'. But when we came to do the shot, the arrangement of the arms with those letters didn't look good. So we decided to improvise and ended up with the best graphic positioning of the arms."

On the UK Parlophone release, the letters formed by the Beatles appear to be "NUJV", whilst the slightly re-arranged US release on Capitol Records appeared to indicate the letters "NVUJ", with McCartney's left hand pointing to the Capitol logo. The Capitol LP was issued in a "deluxe" gatefold sleeve with several photos from the film and was priced $1 more than standard Capitol releases at the time.

Compact disc release
There have been four CD releases of Help! The first was on 30 April 1987, using the 14-song UK track line-up. Having been available only as an import in the US in the past, the original 14-track UK version replaced the original US version with its release on LP and cassette as well on 21 July 1987. As with the CD release of the 1965 Rubber Soul album, the Help! CD featured a contemporary stereo digital remix of the album prepared by Martin in 1986. Martin had expressed concern to EMI over the original 1965 stereo mix, claiming it sounded "very woolly, and not at all what I thought should be a good issue". Martin went back to the original four-track tapes and remixed them for stereo. One of the most notable changes is the echo added to "Dizzy Miss Lizzy", something that was not evident on the original mix of the LP.

When the album was originally released on CD in Canada, pressings were imported from other countries, and used the 1987 remix. However, when the Disque Améric and Cinram plants in Canada started pressing the album, the original 1965 stereo mix was used by mistake. This was the only source for the 1965 stereo mix in its entirety until the release of the mono box set in 2009.

The 2009 remastered stereo CD was released on 9 September. It was "created from the original stereo digital master tapes from Martin's CD mixes made in 1986". The original 1965 stereo mix was included as a bonus on the mono CD contained in The Beatles in Mono boxed set.

The 1965 stereo mix was reissued again on the Help! CD contained in the Beatles collection The Japan Box released in 2014.

Critical reception

Contemporary reviews
Help! was another worldwide critical success for the Beatles. Derek Johnson of the NME said that the LP "maintains the Beatles' usual high standards" and was a "gay, infectious romp which doesn't let up in pace or sparkle from start to finish – with the exception of one slow track". Despite the band's introduction of new instrumentation into their sound, particularly a string quartet on "Yesterday", the reviewer also wrote of the album: "It's typical Beatles material, and offers very few surprises. But then, who wants surprises from the Beatles?" While typical of the light and snappy pop music reviews at the time, according to music journalist Michael Halpin, these comments angered McCartney, who, like his bandmates, believed that artists should constantly develop through their work.

In the United States, where the mainstream press had long focused on the Beatlemania phenomenon and had derided the group's music, as well as rock 'n' roll generally, the summer of 1965 coincided with the first examples of artistic recognition for the Beatles from the country's cultural mainstream. Among these endorsements, Richard Freed of The New York Times likened the band's songs to works from the European art music tradition. Adding to what he described as the Beatles' impact on "serious music", Freed cited musicologists and composers such as Leonard Bernstein and Abram Chasins as admirers of the group's work. Along with several nominations for "Yesterday", Help! was nominated in the category of Album of the Year at the 1966 Grammys Awards. The nomination marked the first time that a rock band had been recognised in this category.

Retrospective assessments

In his review of the Beatles' 1987 CD releases, for Rolling Stone magazine, Steve Pond remarked on the "unstoppable momentum" evident in the band's pre-Rubber Soul albums and recommended Help! "for the relatively quiet and understated way in which they consolidated their strengths". Writing in 2004 edition of The Rolling Stone Album Guide, Rob Sheffield says that the US version of Help! was "utterly ruined" through the replacement of the Beatles songs with the soundtrack music, and that, as a result, the album remained relatively overlooked. He describes the full album as "a big step forward" and "the first chapter in the astounding creative takeoff the Beatles were just beginning".

Mark Kemp of Paste considers it to be the equal of A Hard Day's Night and cites "Help!", "Ticket to Ride" and "Act Naturally" as highlights, along with Harrison's return as a songwriter. Kemp identifies "Yesterday" as "the album's masterpiece" and a song that "set the stage for one of the most groundbreaking and innovative periods in The Beatles' career, not to mention pop music in general". Neil McCormick of The Daily Telegraph says that the album evokes "a band in transition, shifting slightly uncomfortably from the pop thrills of Beatlemania to something more mature", with Lennon's writing increasingly autobiographical and the group's sound growing more sophisticated. McCormick concludes: "Help! may not be their greatest album, but it contains some of their greatest early songs."

In 2000, Help! was voted 119th in the third edition of Colin Larkin's book All Time Top 1000 Albums. In 2006, it was recognised as one of the "Most Significant Rock Albums" in the Greenwood Encyclopedia of Rock History. Two years before then, Tor Milde, music critic for the Norwegian newspaper Verdens Gang, ranked it at number 20 on his list of "The 100 Best Pop and Rock Albums of All Time". In 2003, Rolling Stone ranked Help! number 332 on their list of the "500 Greatest Albums of All Time", raising the ranking to number 331 in the 2012 update and then number 266 in the 2020 list.

Track listing

North American Capitol release

The North American version, the band's eighth Capitol Records album and tenth overall, includes the songs in the film plus selections from the film's orchestral score composed and conducted by Ken Thorne, which contains one of the first uses of the Indian sitar on a rock/pop album, and its very first use on a Beatles record. "Ticket to Ride" is the only song on the American release in Duophonic stereo (also known as "fake stereo") reprocessed from the mono mix. Likewise, the mono version of the album uses a folded-down stereo mix of "Help!" instead of the true mono version used on the single, which features a different vocal track. Help! is available on CD as part of The Capitol Albums, Volume 2 box set. This CD contains both the stereo and mono fold-down versions as heard on the American LP release. A second CD release of this album, which contains the seven songs in true mono mixes, was issued in 2014 individually and as part of the Beatles' The U.S. Albums box set.

All of the non-film tracks from side two of the Parlophone album were spread out through three American albums. Three were already issued on the previously released Beatles VI: "You Like Me Too Much", "Tell Me What You See" and "Dizzy Miss Lizzy". "I've Just Seen A Face" and "It's Only Love" were placed on the Capitol Rubber Soul, with its follow-up album Yesterday and Today receiving the remaining two tracks: "Yesterday" and "Act Naturally".

The American version of Help! reached the number one spot on the Billboard Top LPs chart for nine weeks starting on 11 September 1965.

Track listing

Charts and certifications

Charts

Certifications and sales

In the US, the album sold 1,314,457 copies by 31 December 1965 and 1,594,032 copies by the end of the decade.

Original release

North American release

Personnel
According to Mark Lewisohn and Alan W. Pollack. 

The Beatles
John Lennon – lead, harmony and background vocals; rhythm and acoustic guitars; electric piano, organ on "Dizzy Miss Lizzy"; tambourine on "Tell Me What You See"; snare drum on "I Need You"
Paul McCartney – lead, harmony and background vocals; bass, acoustic and lead guitars; piano, electric piano
George Harrison – harmony and background vocals; lead, acoustic and rhythm guitars; lead vocals on "I Need You" and "You Like Me Too Much"; guiro on "Tell Me What You See"
Ringo Starr – drums and miscellaneous percussion; claves on "Tell Me What You See"; lead vocals on "Act Naturally"

Additional musicians
George Martin – producer, piano on "You Like Me Too Much"
John Scott – tenor and alto flutes on "You've Got to Hide Your Love Away"
String quartet on "Yesterday", arranged by Martin in association with McCartney

Surround versions
The songs included in the soundtrack of the film Help! (tracks 1–7) were mixed into 5.1 surround sound for the film's 2007 DVD release.

Release history

References

Sources

External links

The Beatles' comments on each song
Handwritten lyrics of Help! in The Beatles Loan at the British Library

1965 albums
1965 soundtrack albums
The Beatles albums
Parlophone albums
Albums produced by George Martin
Albums with cover art by Robert Freeman (photographer)
Albums arranged by George Martin
Albums arranged by Paul McCartney
The Beatles soundtracks
The Beatles and India
Capitol Records soundtracks
Parlophone soundtracks